Debra Cain (born 16 July 1956) is an Australian former swimmer. She competed in four events at the 1972 Summer Olympics.

References

External links
 

1956 births
Living people
Australian female backstroke swimmers
Australian female freestyle swimmers
Australian female medley swimmers
Olympic swimmers of Australia
Swimmers at the 1972 Summer Olympics
Place of birth missing (living people)
Commonwealth Games medallists in swimming
Commonwealth Games gold medallists for Australia
Commonwealth Games silver medallists for Australia
Commonwealth Games bronze medallists for Australia
Swimmers at the 1970 British Commonwealth Games
Swimmers at the 1974 British Commonwealth Games
20th-century Australian women
21st-century Australian women
Medallists at the 1970 British Commonwealth Games
Medallists at the 1974 British Commonwealth Games